Hohepa Jacob  (16 November 1894 – 30 May 1955), also known as Harry Jacob, was a New Zealand rugby union player. A wing-forward and loose forward, Jacob represented Horowhenua and Manawhenua at a provincial level, and was a member of the New Zealand Māori side in 1913, 1914, 1922, and 1923, captaining the team in 1922. He was a member of the New Zealand national team, the All Blacks, on their 1920 tour of New South Wales. He played eight matches on that tour, but did not appear in any Test matches.

During World War I, Jacob served in the New Zealand (Māori) Pioneer Battalion, rising to the rank of 2nd lieutenant. He was awarded the Military Cross in the 1919 King's Birthday Honours, and received the medal from the governor-general, Lord Jellicoe, during a vice-regal visit to Levin in November 1921.

References

1894 births
1955 deaths
New Zealand rugby union players
New Zealand international rugby union players
People from Levin, New Zealand
Māori All Blacks players
Horowhenua-Kapiti rugby union players
Manawhenua rugby union players
Rugby union flankers
New Zealand military personnel of World War I
New Zealand recipients of the Military Cross
Rugby union players from Manawatū-Whanganui